Gary Sheehan (24 September 1960 – 16 December 1983) was an Irish Garda Síochána officer who was killed in an exchange of gun fire with the Provisional Irish Republican Army (IRA) during a hostage rescue operation in County Leitrim in Ireland in 1983.

Early life
A native of Carrickmacross, in County Monaghan, Sheehan had worked as a technician before joining the Garda Síochána in September 1983, being given the service number 23589L. Both his father and grandfather had also been police officers. He was also a member of the Carrick Emmets Gaelic Football team.

Derrada shooting
Sheehan was still a probationary Garda, three months into his service and in training at the Garda College at Templemore, when he was deployed in a joint police and Irish Defence Forces search for Don Tidey, Managing Director of the Quinnsworth supermarket chain, who had been kidnapped in the southern outskirts of Dublin for ransom by the IRA to raise finance for its paramilitary activities.

A nationwide manhunt of four weeks gained intelligence information which narrowed the search to the area near Ballinamore in the south-east of County Leitrim. On the afternoon of 16 December 1983, Sheehan and Private Kelly, a soldier in the Irish Army, were part of a joint forces team searching with dogs through Drumcromin Wood, at Derrada, near Ballinamore, when they found the IRA kidnap gang's hideout location, and were shot dead (Sheehan being hit in the head) in an intense exchange of small arms fire with it, during which hand-grenades were also thrown. Tidey was subsequently found nearby and rescued, the IRA gang fleeing the scene, managing to escape, shooting and wounding another Garda officer in the process.

Burial
The body of Recruit Garda Sheehan was buried at Carrickmacross cemetery. He was 23 years of age.

Suspects and subsequent related prosecutions
Though the IRA paramilitary Brendan McFarlane is believed by Garda sources to have led the kidnap gang, no one has been charged with the murders. McFarlane was prosecuted for the kidnapping at Dublin's Special Criminal Court in 2008, but the case collapsed and McFarlane was awarded legal costs and damages.

See also
 List of Gardaí killed in the line of duty

References

External links
 Top garda planned to arrest Bik McFarlane, court hears
 Martin McGuinness confronted by son of murdered soldier

Garda Síochána officers
People from County Monaghan
People killed by the Provisional Irish Republican Army
Garda Síochána officers killed in the line of duty
1960 births
1983 deaths
Alumni of Garda Síochána College
1983 murders in the Republic of Ireland